Starkovia setosus is a species of mite in the family Laelaptonyssidae, found in North America.

References

Mesostigmata